Eparctocyona is a clade of placental mammals comprising the artiodactyls (even-toed ungulates), cetacea (whales and related), and the extinct condylarths.

References 

Mammal unranked clades